Uberto Testa (1569 – August 1623) was a Roman Catholic prelate who served as Bishop of Pula (1618–1623).

Uberto Testa was born in Venice, Italy. On 26 March 1618, he was appointed by Pope Paul V as Bishop of Pula. He served as Bishop of Pula until his death in August 1623.

References

External links and additional sources
 (for Chronology of Bishops) 
 (for Chronology of Bishops) 

17th-century Roman Catholic bishops in Croatia
1623 deaths
Bishops appointed by Pope Paul V
1569 births